Vivegam is a 2017 Indian Tamil-language action thriller film written and directed by Siva. The movie features Ajith Kumar as primary lead, with Vivek Oberoi (in his  Tamil film debut), Kajal Aggarwal, and Akshara Haasan playing the supporting roles. In the film, Ajay Kumar aka ''AK'', a former D.I.A agent undertakes a special mission. However, he is betrayed by his friends who work for a secret agency and is accused of extremely treasonous acts.

The film's background score and soundtrack were composed by Anirudh Ravichander, whose soundtrack album released on 7 August 2017. Cinematography was performed by Vetri and editing by Anthony L. Ruben. Principal photography of the film commenced at Slovenia in August 2016.

Vivegam was released worldwide on 24 August 2017 along with its Telugu dubbed version titled Vivekam.The film received mixed reviews and became an average grosser. The film's music direction, background scores, cast performance, action sequences and concept received critical acclaim. But the film's screenplay, logic mistakes and climax received criticism.

Plot 
An arms exchange deal happens between the General Secretary of Europol police and the head of the Russian mafia gang in a dense Serbian forest, secured with multiple layers of military personnel, where Ajay Kumar "AK", a former Defence Intelligence Agency (D.I.A) agent, successfully intercepts the deal and secures the weapons drive. Meanwhile, the international counter-terrorist group is on the lookout for him. AK's friend and another D.I.A agent, Aryan Singha, is signed to find AK.

Past: AK was one of the most intelligent D.I.A agent at that time. He with his friends Aryan, Rachael, Michael and Shawn, were done all the millitary operations together. And also, between that, AK lives happily with his wife Yazhini, who owns and manages an Indian restaurant. Their life is interrupted by a mission to trace an outlaw hacker, Natasha from Bulgaria, who is responsible for cracking the security codes of the plutonium weapons. There have already been three man-made seismic activities caused by the explosion of plutonium bombs. She is wanted by the Interpol, CIA, and terrorist groups around the world for her hacking skills. AK's mission is to secure Natasha, thereby preventing the two future seismic quakes targeted in India. AK goes back to Serbia in search of Natasha, where he is guided by Arumai Prakasm "APS", a local translator. He interrogates the hospital doctors in the city and finds that Natasha has undergone plastic facial alteration surgery. 

Meanwhile, an Albanian gang has hijacked Natasha's boyfriend and tortured him to death. With the help of the pacemaker found in her boyfriend's body, AK traces Natasha and moves her to a safe house. Natasha is unaware that the code she decrypted was that of a nuclear weapon. She feels guilty and proposes to defuse the remaining weapons from a neutrino site. On their way to the site, Natasha is killed by a group of terrorists. All of the sudden, Aryan and AK's other friends betrayed him and ambush AK by shooting at him. However, AK survives the ambush and retrieves the weapons drive, where he also kills two of his ex-teammates.

Present:  Aryan hires an assassin to kill Yazhini. AK neutralizes the assassins and saves his wife. Later, AK learns that Aryan and his teammates belong to the shadow government which controls the economy of the world by war manipulation. Aryan, as a counter-terrorist officer and shadow government agent, forces AK and his pregnant wife into hiding by blaming AK as the most wanted terrorist. AK releases a video challenging Aryan and his group to save Aryan from being assassinated. AK tries to stop the nuclear weapon from blasting by turning off all the satellites by powerhub. 

To stop AK from continuing his job, Aryan kidnaps Yazhini and keeps her in a secret place. He asks AK whether he will save his wife or stop the bomb. AK seeks proof for her kidnapping as Yazhini provides him with her location using morse code. Aryan shows AK that he has Yazhini on a video call, and Yazhini gives her location by blinking in a pattern consistent with morse code. AK beats up Aryan and prevents the plutonium weapon from exploding. AK, Yazhini, and their infant daughter also named Natasha (after the late hacker) going for a long drive, when suddenly, a mission comes for AK.

Cast 

 Ajith Kumar as Ajay Kumar, "AK" 
 Vivek Oberoi as Aryan Singha
 Kajal Aggarwal as Yazhini Ajay Kumar
 Akshara Haasan as Natasha
 Aarav Chowdhary as Shawn
 Karunakaran as Arumai Prakasam, "APS"
 Amila Terzimehic as Rachael
 Serge Crozon-Cazin as Michael
 Bharath Reddy as Bharath
 Sharat Saxena
 Swaminathan
 Milan in a special appearance

Production

Development 
Anirudh Ravichander was the music composer for the movie. Vetri signed to handle filming, and Ruben edited. Anu Vardhan, who had worked with Ajith in Billa (2007), Aegan (2008), Arrambam (2013) and Vedalam (2015), designed his costumes in this movie. Kaloyan Vodenicharov and K. Ganesh Kumar were the stunt directors.

The title of the film, Vivegam, was announced in February 2017. The official first look poster released along with the title on 2 February. The director revealed that Vivek Obreoi was not playing an antagonist in the movie.

Filming 
Principal photography commenced in Slovenia on 1 August 2016, and it was reported that at least 70% percent of this action thriller was to be shot in Europe. The first schedule was successfully completed in Europe and the second schedule in Ramoji Film City in Hyderabad in October. The team informed that nearly 75 percent of the film shot was complete and the rest of the production was ongoing in Chennai. It was reported that the movie was filmed on a restricted military base in Eastern Europe. The team completed their final shoot schedule in Serbia on such locations like Belgrade city centre, Belgrade Museum of Aviation and Bor lake. Principal photography wrapped in July 2017.

Music 
The soundtrack and score for the film is composed by Anirudh Ravichander, collaborating with Siva and Ajith Kumar for the second time. The soundtrack album features seven songs, with a theme music and a western number, and lyrics for the film was written by Kabilan Vairamuthu, Yogi B, Siva and Raja Kumari.

The first single track, "Surviva" was released on 19 June 2017, which is a western-based EDM number, performed by Yogi B. The second single track "Thalai Viduthalai" was released on 10 July 2017, followed by the third single track "Kadhalaada" released on 20 July 2017. The soundtrack album in its entirety was released through the digital streaming platform Saavn on 7 August 2017.

Vivegam is the soundtrack album for the 2017 Indian Tamil film of the same name, composed by Anirudh Ravichander. The film, directed by Siva, stars Ajith Kumar and Kajal Aggarwal, whilst Vivek Oberoi and Akshara Hassan, portray supporting roles. Kabilan Vairamuthu, Yogi B, Siva and Raja Kumari wrote the lyrics for the film. The soundtrack album featuring seven songs, were released digitally on 7 August 2017, by Sony Music, receiving positive feedback from critics.

Production 
The film marks the second collaboration between Ajith Kumar and Siva, after Vedalam (2015). The song "Surviva" is a western-based EDM number. Performed by Malaysian rapper Yogi B, the song has lyrics about survival. With a tagline "Believe in yourself", this new track is believed to be along similar lines of never giving up and surviving.

The second song "Thalai Viduthalai" is in the death metal rock genre. It is based on a punchline – 'Never, ever GIVE UP!' that became a rage after fans saw Ajith saying in a high-pitched tone in the teaser earlier. Thalai Viduthalai is written by director Siva and is a highly motivating song to wake up in the morning and start your day with a new passion. The philosophy of the song is, irrespective of the number of times you have been knocked down, as long as you are willing to stand up again and fight back, you are not a failure. The heavy metal track and adrenaline pumping lyrics match the larger than life onscreen and off-screen image of Ajith. Besides composing tunes, Anirudh Ravichander has also lent his voice to the song along with Harish Swaminathan. Anirudh quoted that, this song is a tribute and dedication to 'Thala' Ajith Kumar for his 25 years of grit, determination and hardwork in his cinema career"

The third song "Kaadhalada" is a classic number. In one of the recent interviews with a leading daily, Kabilan Vairamuthu, who has penned the lyrics for Kadhalaada song revealed how he got this opportunity. He said, I was initially called in to work on the script; I ve co-written the screenplay. That was my first job in Vivegam, and during a discussion, this opportunity to write the lyrics for a song came up. The lyricist did not reveal much about the song before its release but opened up about the film. He further added, Vivegam has come out in a very stylish manner. I m sure it will be enjoyed by people of all ages." Kabilan is working with Ajith Kumar for the first time.

The audio rights of the film were acquired by Sony Music, for a whooping amount of ₹2 crore. Sridhar Subramanian, the CEO of Sony Music South, confirmed it on Twitter on 14 June 2017.

Release 
The song teaser, for the first single "Surviva" was released on 15 June 2017, at midnight. The full song released on 19 June 2017, directly on Saavn, the music streaming portal, instead of YouTube, and was played over 400,000 times in just over 12 hours, according to a statement from Sony Music. It was the most played song in Saavn. The second single track "Thalai Viduthalai" was released on 10 July 2017 at 12:01 a.m. midnight. The third single "Kadhalaada" was released on 20 July 2017.

Track listing

Tamil version 
Sony Music launched the album preview on 3 August 2017, on YouTube, in which the album consists of seven songs with lyrics written by Kabilan Vairamuthu, Yogi B  Siva and Raja Kumari. The full album was released on 7 August 2017, at 5:00 p.m. on Saavn, and later on other digital platforms.

Telugu version 

The songs of the Telugu version of the film, Vivekam was released on 17 August 2017. Lyrics for the songs were written by Yogi B, Bhaskarabatla Ravikumar and Ramajogayya Sastry.

Kannada (dubbed) version

Reception 
Behindwoods rated the album 3 out of 5, stating that "Anirudh delivers a convincingly International album in his forte for Ajith's Vivegam!" Sharanya CR from The Times of India, reviewed that "With Vivegam, Anirudh manages to give an album with songs that not just suit the mass image of Ajith, but also have an international appeal." Indiaglitz rated it 3.25/5, and received that "Vivegam is easily one of the best albums for Ajith as well as Anirudh; the album is plethora of rock and energy." Sify rated it 4 out of 5 and stated that "Anirudh adds an international flavour to a quintessential ‘mass’ album!" BollywoodLife rated 4 out of 5, with a verdict "Anirudh Ravichander has done it again, composed a winner of an album! He has understood the actioner's theme and the lead star perfectly and composed brilliant, foot tapping tunes. Right form death metal vibes to breezy, romantic tunes, he has given us an impressive variation. All in all, Do NOT miss the Vivegam album." International Business Times, reviewed it as "The album has many songs that win the hearts of the audience and it is easily one of the best albums composed by Anirudh."

Marketing 
The first look poster of Vivegam was released on 2 February 2017 at 12:01 AM. Ajith's physical transformation was praised, given that he had to undergo a painful knee operation in November 2015, after the release of his previous film, Vedalam.

The first teaser trailer  was released by the film's makers on 11 May 2017. It shows Ajith running about, flexing his muscles, dodging bullets and shooting bullets. It became the fastest movie teaser to reach 5 million views within 12 hours after breaking the record of 5 million views set by the Kabali teaser in 24 hours. It went on to become the most liked for an Indian film after surpassing the record of 500 thousand and more likes set by the Tubelight teaser. The trailer of this movie was released on 17 August 2017.

The full trailer was presented by Siva and promises a "Tamil film with an international flavor" . it contains elements of friendship, romance, sentiment and action, unlike the teaser, which was completely action packed. The trailer is dedicated to showing the attitude of Ajith's character, that he will move mountains or die trying. He is beaten again and again, yet he keeps bouncing back.

Release

Theatrical 
Vivegam was released on 24 August 2017. The film was also released in Kannada as Commando in 2018.

Home media
The broadcasting rights were purchased by Sun TV for a record price which was informed through the official social media page of the channel on 9 August 2017.

Reception

Critical response 
The film received mixed reviews from critics. 

The Times of India rated the film 3 out of 5 and said "Vivegam is an over-the-top but engaging action thriller with a calculated mix of brawn and brain, action and sentiment, smartly pandering to fans while giving families something to connect with." NDTV rated the film 2.5 out of 5 stars and cited "Ajith Is Charismatic But Let Down By Silly Scenes". Behindwoods rated the film 2.25 out of 5, stating, "Vivegam – High on production value and action. Heavily dependent on Ajith's persona, engagement factor takes a beating". Mirchi9 gave the film 2 out of 5 stars, saying " Overall, Vivekam is for the fans and fans alone for whom just watching the star on screen is enough. There is ample style and punch dialogues with a healthy dose of action. For everyone else, it is an utterly boring film". Nowrunning rated the film 1.5/5 and said "Director Siva had collected a bunch of Spy movies from Hollywood and made a mashup of them. He picked up all the action blocks and combined it with loud background score which will only irk the audience. Even the action is also missing in the second half and there is no logic at all. The climax is stretched further which disappoints the audience".

Srinivasa Ramanujan of The Hindu wrote, "Vivegam is a misfire on many levels. It's an attempt to make an “international” thriller, with the assumption that a star with a huge fan base would be able to pull it off. Ajith's effort is sincere, but Vivegam just doesn't come together."

Accolades

In popular culture
Exercise scene, the line "Varen ma" uttered by the hero; the scene where the heroine starts singing during the final fight is parodied in Thamizh Padam 2.

References

External links  
 

2017 films
2010s Tamil-language films
2017 action thriller films
Films shot in Slovenia
Films shot in Serbia
Films shot in Europe
Films set in Serbia
Indian spy thriller films
Indian action thriller films
Indian pregnancy films
Films directed by Siva (director)
Films scored by Anirudh Ravichander
Films set in Delhi
Films set in Belgrade
2010s spy thriller films